Statistics of the USFSA Football Championship in the 1900 season.

Tournament

Semifinals 
Le Havre AC 4-0 US Tourcoing

Final  
Le Havre AC 1-0 Club Français

References
RSSF

USFSA Football Championship
1
France